Argemiro Bohórquez (born 28 January 1960) is a Colombian former professional racing cyclist. He rode in two editions of the Tour de France.

Major results
1983
 1st  Overall Tour de Guadeloupe
1984
 1st Stages 2 & 3 Vuelta a Colombia
 8th Overall Tour de l'Avenir
1987
 1st Stage 4 Clásico RCN

Grand Tour general classification results timeline

References

External links

1960 births
Living people
Colombian male cyclists
Sportspeople from Bogotá
Vuelta a Colombia stage winners
20th-century Colombian people